New House or Newhouse is a hamlet in County Durham, England. It lies on the north side of the River Wear, opposite Ireshopeburn, and is linked to the A689 Weardale valley road by Coronation Bridge (built in 1840).

The building known as New House belonged to the Beaumonts, proprietors of the W.B. lead mining company, although it is no longer in the possession of the family following the end of mining in Weardale.  This is probably the origin of the name since the other properties in the hamlet are contemporary with the Beaumont house, or built later.

The 7-bay house is from the 17th century, with alterations in the 18th and 19th.  It was designated as Grade II* listed in 1967, and is now three dwellings.

References

Hamlets in County Durham
Stanhope, County Durham